1. FC Vöcklabruck was an Austrian association football club from Vöcklabruck. They last played in the Austrian Football First League.

History
After the retreat of the Sponsor Resch Eisen, Gase und Transporte notified the club insolvence on. The club was in July 2009 new founded as Vöcklabrucker SC.

Notable coaches
 Dejan Stanković (2009)
 Andrzej Lesiak (2008–2009)
 Frank Schinkels (2007–2008)
 Manfred Bender (2006–2007)
 Igor Pamić (2006)
 Robert Tschaut (2003–2006)
 Albert Kabashi (2000–2003)
 Helmut Nussbaumer (1999–2000)

References

Association football clubs established in 1999
Defunct football clubs in Austria
1999 establishments in Austria
2009 disestablishments in Austria
Association football clubs disestablished in 2009